Quentin Cortez Saulsberry (born October 14, 1988) is an American football offensive lineman who is currently a free agent. He attended Mississippi State University from 2007 to 2011. Saulsberry is the only player in MSU Bulldogs history to play and start every game of his career (49). He was regarded as one of the best center prospects in the 2012 NFL Draft.

Early years
A native of Memphis, Tennessee, Saulsberry attended Independence High School in Independence, Mississippi, where he was a three-star offensive line prospect. He chose Mississippi State over Ole Miss and Memphis.

College career
After redshirting his initial year at Mississippi State, Saulsberry started all 12 games of the year at right tackle. In his sophomore year, he made the transition to left guard, where he started all 12 games and helped pave the way for Anthony Dixon to set a new school record with 1,391 yards. The Bulldog offense lead the SEC and finish ninth nationally in rushing offense, averaging more than 227 yards per game.

In his junior season, Saulsberry started all but three games at right guard. He once started at left guard, and against Houston and Florida, replaced an injured J. C. Brignone at center. In his senior season, he started all 13 games, nine of which at right guard and four at center. He earned All-SEC Honorable Mention by the Associated Press, and played in the 2012 East–West Shrine Game.

Professional career

National Football League
Considered a bit too small for an elite National Football League (NFL) interior lineman, Saulsberry projected as a late-round selection in the 2012 NFL Draft. He eventually went undrafted, but was signed immediately afterwards by the Vikings.  On August 31, 2012 as the Vikings reduced their roster down to league maximum of 53 players, he was released.

On September 3, 2012, Saulsberry was signed to the Denver Broncos' practice squad. On August 25, 2013, he was waived by the Broncos. He was cut after A DUI and a four-week PED suspension.

Arena Football League
On October 23, 2013, Saulsberry was assigned to the Los Angeles KISS of the Arena Football League.

On January 23, 2014, Saulsberry was traded to the New Orleans VooDoo for claim order positioning. The VooDoo placed Saulsberry on the exempt list on April 9, 2014 when he signed with the Blue Bombers. He was activated on June 12, 2014 following his release from the Blue Bombers. Saulsberry started the remaining games for the VooDoo upon his return. On September 24, 2014, the VooDoo picked up Saulsberry's rookie option to retain him for the 2015 season.

Other leagues
On April 10, 2014, Saulsberry was signed by the Winnipeg Blue Bombers. He was released on June 12, 2014. With a family with a new child on the way, Saulsberry went back to Starkville finding a job in a factory then as a prison guard. In 2016, he became a police officer. He participated in The Spring League in April 2017.

References

External links
Denver Broncos bio
Mississippi State Bulldogs bio

1988 births
Living people
People from Memphis, Tennessee
American football offensive linemen
Canadian football offensive linemen
American players of Canadian football
Mississippi State Bulldogs football players
Minnesota Vikings players
Denver Broncos players
Los Angeles Kiss players
New Orleans VooDoo players
Winnipeg Blue Bombers players
The Spring League players